Recea is a commune in Brașov County, Transylvania, Romania. It is composed of seven villages: Berivoi (Berivoj), Dejani (Dezsán), Gura Văii (until 1960 Netotu; Netot), Iași (Jás), Recea, Săsciori (Szeszcsor), and Săvăstreni (Szevesztrény).

The commune is located in Țara Făgărașului, in the western part of the county. It borders Hârseni to the east, Beclean to the north, Lisa and Voila to the west, and Argeș County to the south.

Natives
 (1859–1949)
Traian Herseni (1907–1980)
Ion Gavrilă Ogoranu (1923–2006)

References

Communes in Brașov County
Localities in Transylvania